The Course of Time is a ten-book poem in blank verse, first published in 1827. It was the last published and most famous work of Scottish poet Robert Pollok. The first edition of the poem sold 12,000 copies, and by its fourth edition it had sold 78,000 copies and become well known even in North America.

Pollok himself died in September 1827, only a few months after the poem was published.

An illustrated edition was published in 1857, featuring the work of John Tenniel, Myles Birket Foster, and J. R. Clayton.

References

External links
 Video footage of the Robert Pollok Centenary Monument
 Images and description of the 1857 edition at the Memorial University Digital Archive.

1827 poetry books
1827 poems
Scottish poems
William Blackwood books